Piruzi Street locally known as Namazi Street is a street in central part of Shiraz.

Streets in Shiraz